Talinum fruticosum is a herbaceous perennial plant that is native to Mexico, the Caribbean, West Africa, Central America, and much of South America. Common names include Ceylon spinach, waterleaf, cariru, Gbure, Surinam purslane, Philippine spinach, Florida spinach, potherb fameflower, Lagos bologi, sweetheart, and Kutu bataw in Ghana from the Akan language It is widely grown in tropical regions as a leaf vegetable.

Description 
It bears small, pink flowers and broad, fleshy leaves.

Uses 
As a leaf vegetable, T. fruticosum is rich in vitamins, including vitamins A and C, and minerals such as iron and calcium . Because it is high in oxalic acid, consumption should be avoided or limited by those suffering from kidney disorders, gout, and rheumatoid arthritis . It is cultivated in West Africa, South Asia, Southeast Asia, and the warmer parts of North and South America. Along with Celosia species, T. fruticosum is one of the most important leaf vegetables of Nigeria. In Brazil it is grown along the banks of the Amazon River, and is consumed mainly in the states of Pará and Amazonas.

Gallery

References

External links 

 Talinum triangulare, new host of Ralstonia solanacearum in the Brazilian Amazon
 EcoPort
 Online Nigeria

Caryophyllales
Flora of Bolivia
Flora of Brazil
Flora of the Caribbean
Flora of Central America
Flora of Ecuador
Flora of Guyana
Flora of Mexico
Flora of Peru
Flora of Suriname
Flora of Venezuela
Flora of Pará
Leaf vegetables
Plants described in 1759
Taxa named by Carl Linnaeus
Flora without expected TNC conservation status